Hog Island, an uninhabited 2,075-acre (8 km²) island in Lake Michigan, is the fourth largest island in the Beaver Island archipelago.  It is owned by the U.S. state of Michigan as part of the Beaver Islands State Wildlife Research Area and is administered by the Michigan Department of Natural Resources.

Geography
Hog Island is part of the Beaver Island archipelago, a cluster of islands in the northern portion of Lake Michigan. These islands are composed of erosion-resistant rock that protruded above the water after retreating glaciers had carved out the basin that holds Lake Michigan. Hog Island is approximately 4 miles (6.5 km) long in a north-south direction, and lies off the shore of Emmet County, Michigan. Its low, swampy terrain is of significant interest to naturalists because it is one of the least-disturbed islands in Lake Michigan. Hog Island is very difficult to reach, even by boat. There is point access from Hog Island Point State Forest, which is located just off US Highway 2, seven miles from Naubinway, Michigan.

Flora and fauna
The island's wetlands are important spawning grounds for yellow perch and smallmouth bass, as well as lake birds that feed on fish, such as the common tern, listed as threatened within Michigan.

Three endemic riparian plant species, Houghton's goldenrod, the Lake Huron tansy, and Pitcher's thistle, have been identified on Hog Island.  All three plants are listed as threatened within Michigan. Old-growth northern hardwood and boreal softwood groves also exist on the  island.

View

References

Uninhabited islands of Michigan
Protected areas of Charlevoix County, Michigan
Islands of Lake Michigan in Michigan
Islands of Charlevoix County, Michigan